Yannick Noah was the defending champion, but lost in the final to Andrés Gómez. The score was 6–4, 7–6(7–5), 7–6(7–1).

Seeds

Draw

Finals

Top half

Section 1

Section 2

Bottom half

Section 3

Section 4

References

External links
 Official results archive (ATP)
 Official results archive (ITF)

World Championship Tennis Tournament of Champions
1987 Grand Prix (tennis)